Melton Memorial Observatory  is an astronomical observatory owned and operated by University of South Carolina.  It is named after William Davis Melton and built in 1928.  It is located in Columbia, South Carolina (USA).

See also 
List of observatories

References

External links
Melton Memorial Observatory
West Columbia Clear Sky Clock Forecast of observing conditions covering Melton Memorial Observatory.

Astronomical observatories in South Carolina
University of South Carolina
Buildings and structures in Columbia, South Carolina
Tourist attractions in Columbia, South Carolina